Map of places in South Lanarkshire compiled from this list

The List of places in South Lanarkshire is a list of links for any town, village and hamlet in the South Lanarkshire council area of Scotland.

A
Abington
Allanton
Ashgill
 Ardochrig
 Auchengray
Auchenheath
Auchlochan
Auldhouse

B
 Bankend
 Barncluith
 Biggar
 Birniehill
Blackwood
Blairbeth
Blantyre
Boghead
Braehead
Braidwood
Brown Rig
Burnbank
Burnside

C
Caldermill
 Calderwood
Cambuslang
Carluke
Carmichael
Carnwath
Carstairs
Chapelton
Cleghorn, South Lanarkshire
Coalburn
Cobbinshaw
 College Milton 
Corehouse
Coulter
Crawford
Crawfordjohn
Crossford
 Crutherland

D
Dalserf
Deadwaters
Dolphinton
Douglas
Douglas Water
Drumclog
 Drumsagard
Dungavel
Dunsyre

E
 Earnock Estate
Eastfield 
East Kilbride
 East Kilbride Village 
 East Mains
Elsrickle
Elvanfoot

F
Fairhill 
Fernhill 
 Ferniegair
Forth

G
 Gardenhall
Garrion Bridge
Glassford
Glespin
 Greenhills

H
 Hairmyres
Hallside
Halfway
Hamilton
 Hamilton West
High Blantyre
 Hillhouse

J
Jackton

K
 Kelvin
Kilncadzow
Kirkfieldbank 
 Kirkhill 
Kirkmuirhill

L
Larkhall
Law Village
Leadhills
Lesmahagow
Lindsayfield 
Little Sparta

M
 Mossneuk
 Murrayhill

N
Nerston
Netherburn 
New Lanark
 Newlandsmuir
Newton 
New Trows
Newbigging

P
 Peel Park
Pettinain
 Philipshill

Q
Quarter
Quothquan

R
Rigside
Roberton
 Rogerton
Rosebank
Rutherglen

S
Sandford
Shawfield
Springhall
 St Leonards
 Stewartfield 
Stonebyres
Stonehouse
Strathaven
Symington

T
Tarbrax
Thankerton
 The Murray
Thorntonhall

U
Uddingston
Unthank

W
Watermeetings
Westburn
 West Mains 
 Westwood
 Westwoodhill 
Whitehill
Whitehills
Whitlawburn
Wilsontown
Wiston
Woolfords

Y
Yieldshields

See also
List of places in Scotland

Lists of places in Scotland
Populated places in Scotland